Agylla, also formerly known as Churinga, is a genus of moths in the subfamily Arctiinae. The genus was erected by Francis Walker in 1854.

Species
Agylla argentea (Walker, 1863)
Agylla argentifera (Walker, 1866)
Agylla asakurana (Matsumura, 1931)
Agylla auraria (Dognin, 1892)
Agylla barbicosta Hampson, 1900
Agylla barbipalpia Schaus, 1899
Agylla beema (Moore, [1866])
Agylla corcovada (Schaus, 1894)
Agylla dentifera Hampson, 1900
Agylla dognini Hampson, 1900
Agylla fasciculata Walker, 1854
Agylla flavitincta Dognin, 1899
Agylla foyi (Dognin, 1894)
Agylla gigas (Heylaerts, 1891)
Agylla hermanilla (Dognin, 1894)
Agylla involuta Hampson, 1900
Agylla maasseni (Dognin, 1894)
Agylla marcata (Schaus, 1894)
Agylla marginata (Druce, 1885)
Agylla metaxantha (Hampson, 1895)
Agylla nivea (Walker, 1856)
Agylla nochiza (Dognin, 1894)
Agylla nubens (Schaus, 1899)
Agylla obliquisigna Schaus, 1899
Agylla pallens (Hampson, 1894)
Agylla perpensa (Schaus, 1894)
Agylla polysemata Schaus, 1899
Agylla postfusca (Hampson, 1894)
Agylla prasena (Moore, 1859)
Agylla pulchristriata Kishida, 1984
Agylla rotunda Hampson, 1900
Agylla semirufa (Hampson, 1896)
Agylla separata (Schaus, 1894)
Agylla septentrionalis Barnes & McDunnough, 1911
Agylla sericea (Druce, 1885)
Agylla sinensis (Leech, 1899)
Agylla strigula Hampson, 1900
Agylla tobera (Dognin, 1894)
Agylla tolteca (Schaus, 1889)
Agylla tumidicosta Hampson, 1900
Agylla umbrifera (Felder, 1874)
Agylla umbrosa (Dognin, 1894)
Agylla venosa (Schaus, 1894)
Agylla virago Rothschild, 1913
Agylla vittata (Leech, 1899)
Agylla zopisa (Dognin, 1894)
Agylla zucarina (Dognin, 1894)

References

 
Lithosiina
Moth genera